The Eleventh Battle of the Isonzo was a World War I battle fought by the Italian and Austro-Hungarian Armies on the Italian Front between 18 August and 12 September 1917.

Background 
On the Soča (Isonzo) River, Luigi Cadorna, the Italian Chief of Staff, concentrated three quarters of his troops: 600 battalions (52 divisions) with 5,200 guns.

Battle 
The attack was carried forth from a front from Tolmin (in the upper Isonzo valley) to the Adriatic Sea. The Italians crossed the river at several points on temporary bridges, but the main effort was exerted on the Banjšice Plateau, whose capture was to further the offensive and break the Austro-Hungarian lines in two segments, isolating the strongholds of Mount Saint Gabriel and Mount Hermada.

After fierce and deadly fightings, the Italian Second Army, led by General Capello, pushed back Boroević's Isonzo Armee, conquering the Bainsizza and Mount Santo. Other positions were taken by the Duke of Aosta's Third Army.

However, Mount Saint Gabriel and Mount Hermada turned out to be impregnable, and the offensive wore out.

After the battle, the Austro-Hungarians were exhausted, and could not have withstood another attack. So were the Italians, who could not find the resources necessary for another assault, even though it might have been the decisive one. So the final result of the battle was an inconclusive bloodbath. Moreover, the end of the battle left the Italian Second Army (until then the most successful of the Italian Armies) split in two parts across the Soča (Isonzo), a weak point that proved to be decisive in the subsequent Twelfth Battle of the Isonzo.

To commemorate the participation of the Royal Bavarian Infantry Lifeguards Regiment, Georg Fürst wrote the March "Isonzo-Marsch". The Italians fired 5.5 million artillery shells during the battle, including poison gas shells.Faldella, Emilio: La grande guerra, vol. I, Milan 1978, pp. 274.

See also
First Battle of the Isonzo – 23 June–7 July 1915
Second Battle of the Isonzo – 18 July–3 August 1915
Third Battle of the Isonzo – 18 October–3 November 1915
Fourth Battle of the Isonzo – 10 November–2 December 1915
Fifth Battle of the Isonzo – 9–17 March 1916
Sixth Battle of the Isonzo – 6–17 August 1916
Seventh Battle of the Isonzo – 14–17 September 1916
Eighth Battle of the Isonzo – 10–12 October 1916
Ninth Battle of the Isonzo – 1–4 November 1916
Tenth Battle of the Isonzo – 12 May–8 June 1917
Twelfth Battle of the Isonzo – 24 October–7 November 1917 also known as the Battle of Caporetto

References

Further reading

External links
Eleventh Battle of the Isonzo
FirstWorldWar.Com: The Battles of the Isonzo, 1915-17
Battlefield Maps: Italian Front
11 battles at the Isonzo
The Walks of Peace in the Soča Region Foundation. The Foundation preserves, restores and presents the historical and cultural heritage of the First World War in the area of the Isonzo Front for the study, tourist and educational purposes.
The Kobarid Museum
Društvo Soška Fronta  
Pro Hereditate - extensive site  

Isonzo 11
Isonzo 11
Isonzo 11
Isonzo 11
Isonzo 11
the Isonzo
1917 in Italy
1917 in Austria-Hungary
August 1917 events
September 1917 events
Military operations of World War I involving chemical weapons
World War I crimes by the Allies
Italian war crimes